Alfred John "Whitey" Abel (March 16, 1903 – February 11, 1969) was a jockey, trainer, owner as well as a breeder of Thoroughbred racehorses who rode Bostonian to victory in the 1927 Preakness Stakes, run that year as the first leg of the U.S. Triple Crown series.

Career
On April 6, 1923, Whitey Abel rode five winners on a single racecard at Bowie Racetrack.

After becoming a trainer, Abel owned and bred racehorses.  He often purchased horses out of claiming races but of those he bred and raced, stakes winner Gramps Image is likely the best known.

References

1903 births
1969 deaths
American jockeys
American horse trainers
American racehorse owners and breeders